Tyler Mabry (born November 21, 1996) is an American football tight end for the Seattle Seahawks of the National Football League (NFL). He played college football at Buffalo and Maryland.

College career
Mabry began his collegiate career at Buffalo and redshirted his true freshman season. As a redshirt junior, he caught 27 passes for 230 yards and two touchdowns and was named first-team All-Mid-American Conference. Mabry transferred to the University of Maryland as a graduate transfer for his final season of NCAA eligibility. In his only season with the Terrapins, Mabry started all 12 of the team's games and caught 13 passes for 155 yards and three touchdowns.

Professional career

Mabry signed with the Seattle Seahawks as an undrafted free agent on May 4, 2020. He was waived at the end of training camp during final roster cuts on September 5, 2020, but was signed by to the team's practice squad the following day. Mabry spent the entire 2020 season on the Seahawks' practice squad and signed a reserve/futures contract with the team on January 11, 2021. He was waived at the end of the preseason on August 31, 2021, and again resigned to the practice squad on September 1. The Seahawks promoted Mabry to their active roster on September 6, 2021. He was waived on November 12 and re-signed to the practice squad. He was promoted back to the active roster on January 8, 2022.

On August 30, 2022, Mabry was waived by the Seahawks and signed to the practice squad the next day.

He was promoted to the Seahawks' active roster on December 31, 2022 and scored his first NFL touchdown the next day on a seven-yard reception from Geno Smith in the second quarter of the game against the New York Jets.

References

External links
Buffalo Bulls bio
Maryland Terrapins bio
Seattle Seahawks bio

Living people
1996 births
Players of American football from Michigan
American football tight ends
Buffalo Bulls football players
Maryland Terrapins football players
Seattle Seahawks players
Sportspeople from Ypsilanti, Michigan